WPOM (1600 AM) is a radio station broadcasting ethnic programming. Licensed to Riviera Beach, Florida, United States, the station serves the West Palm Beach area. The station is currently owned by Carline Clerge, through licensee Caribbean Media Group, Inc.

History
The station went on the air as WHEW on August 17, 1959. In 1969, the station changed its call letters to WXVI; by 1970, the station had a middle-of-the-road format. In 1971, the station became WPOM, with a contemporary format. In the intervening years, WPOM would adopt several other formats, including all-news in the late 1970s, disco in the early 1980s, and a split format of gospel and blues by 1999.

Hibernia Broadcasting, whose stations were all affiliated with Radio Disney, acquired WPOM in 1999, and switched the station to Radio Disney on June 16, 1999; to better reflect the format, the station adopted the WMNE callsign, referring to Minnie Mouse, on July 9. Hibernia was acquired by Disney, through ABC, in 2000.

Disney sold WMNE to Travis Media, LLC in January 2010. In the interim, Disney took the station, and five other stations slated to be sold, off the air on January 22. The station resumed broadcasting on May 6; on June 2, the call letters were changed to WHTY.

In March 2015, Carline Clerge, who already owned 42% of the station, agreed to acquire the remaining 58% from Robert Travis and David Urbach; upon taking control on August 24, 2015, Clerge transferred WHTY from Travis Media to Caribbean Media Group, another company she controls. The call sign was changed back to WPOM on August 24, 2015.

References

External links
Former station website

POM
Radio stations established in 1959
1959 establishments in Florida
Former subsidiaries of The Walt Disney Company